Puerto San Julián, also known historically as Port St. Julian, is a natural harbour in Patagonia in the Santa Cruz Province of Argentina located at . Nowadays Puerto San Julián is also the name of a small town (population 6,143 as per the ) located on the harbour.

History
Puerto San Julián was given its name by the Portuguese explorer Ferdinand Magellan who arrived there on 31 March 1520 and overwintered in the harbour. They met the native people who were described by Antonio Pigafetta as giants, and called them Patagonians. Although Pigafetta's account does not describe how this name came about, subsequent popular interpretations gave credence to a derivation meaning 'land of the big feet'. However, this etymology is questionable. The term is most likely derived from an actual character name, "Patagón", a savage creature confronted by Primaleón of Greece, the hero in the Spanish chivalry novel by Francisco Vázquez, published in 1512, much in fashion at the time, and a favourite reading of Magellan. Magellan's perception of the natives, dressed in skins, and eating raw meat, clearly recalled the uncivilized Patagón in Vázquez's book. Novelist and travel writer Bruce Chatwin suggests etymological roots of both Patagon and Patagonia in his book, In Patagonia, noting the similarity between "Patagon" and the Greek word παταγος, which means "a roaring" or "gnashing of teeth" (in his chronicle, Pigafetta describes the Patagonians as "roaring like bulls").

At the start of April, Magellan was faced by a mutiny led by his Spanish captains at midnight on Easter day, but succeeded in overcoming it, executing mutineers including one captain and leaving another behind. He left the port on 21 August 1520 and on 21 October found the eastern entrance to the passageway he was looking for, the strait that now bears his name.

Fifty-eight years later Francis Drake during his circumnavigation reached the harbour, arriving on 15 June 1578 and also choosing to overwinter. They found the remains of the gallows where Magellan had executed mutineers. Drake had also been having difficulty with discontent during the voyage, and charged his friend Thomas Doughty with treachery and incitement to mutiny. A trial found Doughty guilty, but only on the mutiny charge.  At Drake's insistence, Doughty was beheaded, but this stern example did not have the desired effect.  Increasing tensions between mariners and gentlemen explorers brought the prospect of mutiny about a month later. Drake used a sermon to make a speech laying down rules of conduct, with himself in sole command. In August they went on to the Strait of Magellan.

The settlement of Floridablanca, a short lived Spanish colony of approximately 150 people, was founded not far from San Julián in 1780 by King Charles III. It was abandoned by 1784, and its ruins were rediscovered during the 1980s.

The port continued in use, and the young naturalist Charles Darwin arrived with the Beagle survey expedition under captain Robert FitzRoy in January 1834. While HMS Beagle carried out its hydrographic survey, Darwin explored the local geology in cliffs near the harbour and found fossils of pieces of spine and a hind leg of "some large animal, I fancy a Mastodon". On their return to England, the anatomist Richard Owen revealed that the bones were actually from a gigantic creature resembling the Llama and the camel, which Owen named Macrauchenia. This was one of the discoveries leading to the inception of Darwin's theory.

During the late 19th and early 20th centuries, San Julián and the surrounding countryside (or "camp" as it was known in the argot of the day) was an important sheep-raising region, and the "Swift" company installed a frigorifico, or freezer plant complex, along the coast to the north of the city itself.

During the 1982 Falklands War, as San Julian is one of the nearest point to the islands, the city airfield was used by the Argentine Air Force. Two fighter squadrons, flying Daggers and A-4 Skyhawks, made 149 sorties against the British in the 45 days of operations. Ironically, many of the first permanent inhabitants of Puerto San Julián had been British subjects from the Falkland Islands, as part of the region's sheep-raising industry.

Climate
Puerto San Julián has a cold semi-arid climate (Köppen climate classification: BSk) that is nevertheless mild for its latitude. Summers are mild and dry, whereas winter remain firmly above freezing during daytime, with frosts being common albeit often light during nights.

Notable residents 
Viviana Alder, Antarctic researcher

References

Notes

External links

Official Government site
Official Government site 2006 War Anniversary 
Ferdinand Magellan
Frigorífico
Geometry.net Magellan, Ferdinand
Who had gone before?
Drake: The Famous Voyage: The Circumnavigation of the World, 1577-1580
 Broadside: Anson's Circumnavigation, 1740]
Portal of the town of Puerto San Julián.

Panoramic virtual tour of San Julián from the lighthouse

Ports and harbours of Argentina
Populated coastal places in Argentina
Populated places in Santa Cruz Province, Argentina
Cities in Argentina
Argentina
Santa Cruz Province, Argentina